Jim Nicholson (died May 8, 1983) was an American football player and coach. He was the first full-time head football coach at the University of Toledo, serving from 1930 to 1935, and compiling a record of 20–16–4.  Nicholson attended Denison University, where he played football and basketball and ran track.  Before coming to Toledo in 1930, Nicholson coached at Sandusky High School in Sandusky, Ohio.

Head coaching record

References

Year of birth missing
1983 deaths
Denison Big Red football players
Denison Big Red men's basketball players
Toledo Rockets football coaches
College men's track and field athletes in the United States